Viktor Ader (4 October 1910 – 7 September 1966) was an Estonian football player. He was born and died in Tallinn.

References

External links

1910 births
1966 deaths
Footballers from Tallinn
People from Kreis Harrien
Estonian footballers
Association football midfielders
Estonia international footballers